North Lake is a large area of Pasadena, California, comprising all of the neighborhoods along North Lake Avenue between Walnut Street and Woodbury Road.

Neighborhoods
Normandie Heights
Lexington Heights
Washington Square
Bungalow Heaven
Olive Heights
Catalina Villas

Neighborhoods in Pasadena, California